Gocha Trapaidze (born 9 May 1976) is a Georgian footballer currently playing for Yuksak Liqa club FK Karvan as a midfielder.

External links
Player profile

1976 births
Living people
Footballers from Georgia (country)
SC Tavriya Simferopol players
FC Volyn Lutsk players
FC Dinamo Tbilisi players
Ukrainian Premier League players
Expatriate footballers from Georgia (country)
Expatriate footballers in Azerbaijan
Expatriate footballers in Ukraine
Expatriate sportspeople from Georgia (country) in Ukraine
Association football midfielders
Expatriate sportspeople from Georgia (country) in Azerbaijan